The 1942 All-Eastern football team consists of American football players chosen by various selectors as the best players at each position among the Eastern colleges and universities during the 1942 college football season.

All-Eastern selections

Backs
 Paul Governali, Columbia (AP-1)
 Bill Dutton, Pittsburgh (AP-1)
 John Bezemes, Holy Cross (AP-1)
 Mike Holovak, Boston College (AP-1)

Ends
 Don Currivan, Boston College (AP-1)
 Bob Davis, Penn State (AP-1)

Tackles
 George Connor, Holy Cross (AP-1)
 Robin Olds, Army (AP-1)

Guards
 Ernest Alther, Syracuse (AP-1)
 Bob Orlando, Colgate (AP-1)

Centers
 Spencer Moseley, Yale (AP-1)

Key
 AP = Associated Press

See also
 1942 College Football All-America Team

References

All-Eastern
All-Eastern college football teams